Drusti Parish is an administrative unit of Smiltene Municipality, Latvia. Prior to the 2009 administrative reforms it was part of Cēsis District.

Towns, villages and settlements of Drusti parish 
 Drusti

Parishes of Latvia
Smiltene Municipality